Trimeresurus fasciatus is a venomous pit viper species endemic to Djampea Island, Indonesia. No subspecies are currently recognized. Common names include: banded pitviper and banded tree viper.

Description
Scalation includes 21 rows of dorsal scales at midbody, 158-160/159-163 ventral scales in males/females, 63-65/61 subcaudal scales, and 9 or 10 (less frequently 11) supralabial scales.

Geographic range
It is found only on Djampea Island, Indonesia. The type locality given is "Jampea Island" (Djampea, Indonesia). The catalogue entry at the British Museum of Natural History lists the type locality as "Jampea Id., between Celebes and Flores".

References

Further reading
 Boulenger, G.A. 1896. Descriptions of new Reptiles and Batrachians obtained by Mr. Alfred Everett in Celebes and Jampea. Annals and Magazine of Natural History, Series 6, 18: 62–64. (Lachesis fasciatus, pp. 63–64.)

External links

Reptiles described in 1896
Endemic fauna of Indonesia
Reptiles of Sulawesi
fasciatus